2Moons The Series (lit. "Moon Courting Moon") is a 2017 Thai BL drama series. The first season aired on One31 from May 7, 2017 to July 23, 2017, starring Suradet Piniwat, Itthipat Thanit, Warodom Khemmonta, Panuwat Kerdthongtavee, Darvid Kreepolrerk and Thanapon Jarujitranon. The second season 2moon 2 aired on Mello Thailand from June 29, 2019 to September 14, 2019, starring Benjamin Brasier, Teerapat Ruangritkul, Archen Aydin, Kornchid Boonsathitpakdee, Naret Promphaopun, and Woranart Ratthanaphast. It is adapted from the novel series เดือนเกี้ยวเดือน (Moon Courting Moon) by Chiffon_cake. The first four episodes of the second season (2Moons2) are a recap of the first season's Phana-Wayo story (with a different cast), with the stories of all characters continuing in the remaining episodes.

Plot 
Wayo Panitchayasawad (Yo) is a freshman at the same university where his long time love, Phana Kongthanin (Pha), is a second-year student. Pha is extremely popular and the Campus Moon of last year but does not seem to like the attention. When Yo gets the opportunity to become the Moon of his faculty, he realizes he gets to see Pha more. Although, their relationship starts quite rough since Pha seems to pick on Yo.

Cast

Soundtrack 
2Moons
 Pause (band) – "Kae Dai Bpen Kon Soot Tai Tee Tur Kit Teung" (opening theme)
 PHCY – "Nup Neung Gun Mai" (ending title ep. 1-3, 9-10, 12 + 1 special)
 Memê – "Eek Krung... Dai Mai" (ending theme ep. 4-8)
 Bas Suradet – "Kon Tummadah (Cover Version)" (ending theme ep. 11)
 The Bottom Blues – "1 2 3 4 5 I Love You"
 Calories Blah Blah – "Yahk Roo... Dtae Mai Yahk Tahm"
2Moons2
 August Vachiravit – "Between Us" (opening theme)

Awards and nominations 
2Moons
LINE TV Awards 2018 – Best Kiss Scene [Itthipat Thanit and Suradet Piniwat] (Winner)
2Moons2
Content Asia Awards 2020 - Best LGBT + Program (Nomination)

References

Exte 
 
 

Thai romantic comedy television series
2017 Thai television series debuts
2010s teen drama television series
Thai boys' love television series
One 31 original programming
2010s LGBT-related drama television series